David Martin (born 22 June 1953), is a Northern Irish football official who is currently a member of the FIFA Council elected since 2021.

He previously ran for the FIFA Council in 2019, only defeated by Greg Clarke. After Clarke's resignation, in April 2021, he was elected to the FIFA Council, receiving 48 of 55.

He is also currently the president of the Irish Football Association, since 2016.

References

1953 births
Living people